C. bolivari may refer to:

Catoptria bolivari, a species of moth in the family Crambidae 
Cosmosoma bolivari, a moth in the family Erebidae